Swans Reflecting Elephants (1937) is a painting by the Spanish surrealist Salvador Dalí. This painting is from Dalí's Paranoiac-critical period. Painted using oil on canvas, it contains one of Dalí's famous double images. The double images were a major part of Dalí's "paranoia-critical method", which he put forward in his 1935 essay "The Conquest of the Irrational". He explained his process as a "spontaneous method of irrational understanding based upon the interpretative critical association of delirious phenomena." Dalí used this method to bring forth the hallucinatory forms, double images and visual illusions that filled his paintings during the Thirties. 

As with the earlier Metamorphosis of Narcissus, Swans Reflecting Elephants uses the reflection in a lake to create the double image seen in the painting. In Metamorphosis, the reflection of Narcissus is used to mirror the shape of the hand on the right of the picture. Here, the three swans in front of bleak, leafless trees are reflected in the lake so that the swans' necks become the elephants' trunks, the swans' bodies become the elephants' ears, and the trees become the legs of the elephants. In the background of the painting is a Catalan landscape depicted in fiery fall colors, the brushwork creating swirls in the cliffs that surround the lake, to contrast with the stillness of the water.

References

Paintings by Salvador Dalí
Surrealist paintings
1937 paintings
Elephants in art
Birds in art
Water in art